Dohmen is a surname. Notable people by that name include:

 Albert Dohmen (born 1956), German operatic bass-baritone
 Arnold Dohmen (1906-1980), German bacteriologist
 John-John Dohmen (born 1988), Belgian hockey player 
 Rolf Dohmen (born 1952), German football coach
 Malachi Dohmen (born 1994), German mathematician